Haldimand was a federal electoral district in the province of Ontario, Canada, that was represented in the House of Commons of Canada from 1867 to 1892 and from 1904 to 1953. It was created by the British North America Act of 1867.

It initially consisted of the Townships of Oneida, Seneca, Cayuga North, Cayuga South, Rainham, Walpole, and Dunn. In 1872, the Township of Dunn was excluded from the riding. In 1882, it was defined to consist of the townships of Walpole, Oneida, Rainham, Seneca and North Cayuga, and the villages of Cayuga and Caledonia.

The electoral district was abolished in 1892 when it was merged into Haldimand and Monck riding.

Haldimand riding was recreated in 1903, consisting of the county of Haldimand.

The electoral district was abolished in 1952 when it was merged into Brant—Haldimand riding.

Members of Parliament

This riding elected the following members of the House of Commons of Canada:

Election results

1867–1896

1904–1943

See also 

 List of Canadian federal electoral districts
 Past Canadian electoral districts

References

External links 
Riding history 1867 to 1892 from the Library of Parliament
Riding history 1904 to 1953 from the Library of Parliament

Former federal electoral districts of Ontario